Dennis Donahue (born August 22, 1944) is an American biathlete. He competed at the 1972 Winter Olympics and the 1976 Winter Olympics.

References

1944 births
Living people
American male biathletes
Olympic biathletes of the United States
Biathletes at the 1972 Winter Olympics
Biathletes at the 1976 Winter Olympics
Sportspeople from Miami